Charing Cross tube crash may refer to

Charing Cross (Northern line) tube crash, in 1938
Charing Cross (District line) tube crash, also in 1938